Alvise Giovanni Mocenigo (1701–1778) was doge of Venice from 1763 until his death.

Political career
He restricted the privileges of the clergy and, in consequence, came into bitter conflict with Pope Clement XIII.

In trying to spur on the economy, he made important commercial agreements with Tripoli, Tunisia, Morocco, the Russian Empire, and with America.

He died on 31 December 1778. He was married in 1739 to Pisana Cornaro (d. 1769) and in 1771 to Polissena Contarini Da Mula.

See also
Mocenigo family

References

1701 births
1778 deaths
Alvise
18th-century Italian people
18th-century Doges of Venice